Heshmatabad (also Romanized as Ḩeshmatābād) is a village in Safaiyeh Rural District, in the Central District of Zaveh County, Razavi Khorasan Province, Iran. At the 2006 census, its population was 394, in 94 families.

References 

Populated places in Zaveh County